The 1904 United States House of Representatives elections in Florida for three seats in the 59th Congress were held November 8, 1904, alongside the election for President and the election for governor.

Background
In 1902, all three districts were uncontested, with two incumbents being re-elected and one freshman Representative being elected to the newly created .  In 1904, the Republicans and the Socialists ran against the dominant Democrats in all three districts, without success.

Election results
Democrat Robert Wyche Davis in the  did not run for re-election in 1904. He had served for four terms, first being elected in 1896.

See also
United States House of Representatives elections, 1904

References

1904
Florida
United States House of Representatives